This is a list of active and extinct volcanoes in Honduras.

Volcanoes

See also
 Central America Volcanic Arc
 List of volcanoes in El Salvador
 List of volcanoes in Guatemala
 List of volcanoes in Nicaragua

References 

Honduras
 
Volcanoes